Kévin Florient Edmond Jean Crovetto (born 10 June 1992) is a Monegasque male artistic gymnast, representing his nation in international competitions. He participated in two editions of the World Championships (2014 in Nanjing, China, and 2015 in Glasgow, Scotland), and qualified for the 2016 Summer Olympics.

References

External links 
 

1992 births
Living people
Monegasque male artistic gymnasts
Place of birth missing (living people)
Gymnasts at the 2016 Summer Olympics
Olympic gymnasts of Monaco
Competitors at the 2018 Mediterranean Games
Gymnasts at the 2022 Mediterranean Games
Mediterranean Games competitors for Monaco